The 1972 British Grand Prix (formally the John Player Grand Prix) was a Formula One motor race held at Brands Hatch on 15 July 1972. It was race 7 of 12 in both the 1972 World Championship of Drivers and the 1972 International Cup for Formula One Manufacturers. The race was won by Brazilian driver Emerson Fittipaldi driving a Lotus 72D.

Ronnie Peterson suffered an engine failure with less than two laps to go, and crashed into the parked cars of Graham Hill and François Cevert.

Qualifying

Qualifying classification

Race

Classification

Championship standings after the race

Drivers' Championship standings

Constructors' Championship standings

Note: Only the top five positions are included for both sets of standings.

References

British Grand Prix
British Grand Prix
European Grand Prix
Grand Prix